Estádio do Costa do Sol is a multi-purpose stadium in Maputo, Mozambique.  It is currently used mostly for football matches and is the home stadium of Clube de Desportos da Costa do Sol.  The stadium holds 10,000 people.

References

Costa do Sol
Multi-purpose stadiums in Mozambique
Buildings and structures in Maputo
Sport in Maputo